Partners Capital Investment Group, LLC is an outsourced investment office (OCIO) that serves endowments, foundations, pensions, investment professionals, and high-net-worth families in Europe, North America and Asia. As of 30 June 2022, the 294-person firm had $45 billion in assets under management.

Overview
Partners Capital acts as the OCIO to endowments, foundations and high-net-worth private clients. Its private clients are primarily money managers, including senior partners and founders of investment firms. The firm was founded in London in 2001 by Stan Miranda and Paul Dimitruk. Since its inception, the firm has grown from $10 million in assets to $45 billion in 2022. Today, the firm has offices in Boston, New York, San Francisco, Paris, Singapore and Hong Kong, in addition to London, and has 294 employees.

The firm invests exclusively with unaffiliated managers with which it shares no economics.  It is the firm’s belief that the OCIO’s role should be entirely separate from the role of managing assets.

Partners Capital has commented publicly about the need for the ”Yale Model” of endowment investing to evolve to reflect key lessons of the global financial crisis.

Notable clients
Partners Capital has clients globally. Notable European institutional clients include individual colleges at Cambridge and Oxford universities, Eton College, INSEAD, the Royal Academy of Arts, the National Gallery Trust, the Victoria and Albert Museum, and Guy's and St. Thomas' Charity.

Notable US institutional clients include the Research Foundation for the State University of New York’s University System, Syracuse University, Milton Academy, the Berkshire School, the Los Angeles Museum of Contemporary Art, and the Cancer Research Institute.

Founders
Prior to Partners Capital, Stan Miranda was a partner at Bain and Company, specializing in private equity. Paul Dimitruk was a co-founder, chairman and CEO of asset manager Pareto Partners and prior to that a partner at Investcorp, where he specialized in private equity.

References

External links
 Partners Capital Official Website

Investment
Financial services companies established in 2001